Carlisle School is a private, college preparatory,  Independent School located in Axton, Virginia, United States, that teaches Preschool 3 through Grade 12. It serves nearly 300 students. It was established in 1968. The Head of School is Gracie Agnew. The school is not for profit and as a board of directors that oversee it.

Academics
Carlisle School offers a college-preparatory curriculum included Honors, Advanced Placement and Dual Enrollment Courses. Upper School students (Grades 9-12), in addition to their core curriculum, can choose to take various electives, such as Choir, Drama, Journalism, Engineering, Finance, and Business. They are also required to participate in one special-interest club.

Middle School (Grades 6-8) offers a curriculum in the areas of science, mathematics, languages and the humanities, and routinely requires students with interdisciplinary assignments that involve research, technological components, and writing. Students in the Middle School are also offered various electives.

The Lower School (Preschool 3 - Grade 5) curriculum is supplemented with instruction in the foreign language, technology, art, drama, creative movement, music, library, research, guidance, and physical education. A science laboratory and computer laboratory are available to students in Kindergarten through fifth grade.

Since Carlisle's inception, 100% of graduates have been accepted into four-year colleges and universities.

Athletics
Athletic options are open to all Middle and Upper School students. Athletic teams include baseball, boys and girls basketball, cross country, field hockey, golf, boys and girls soccer, swimming, boys and girls tennis, and volleyball. Boys teams compete in the Virginia Independent Conference and girls teams in the Blue Ridge Conference. In the summer of 2022 Carlisle made a renovation to their gym floor.

Arts
Choir, Dance, and Drama are made available to all students, and they routinely take part in on-stage musical and theatrical performances.

International Program
Carlisle's Upper School (grades 9-12) students are approximately 80% local and 20% international from across the globe. In recent years, students have enrolled from Australia, India, Nigeria, China, Japan, Columbia, South Korea, Libya, Sudan, Finland, Mexico, Germany, Italy and Sweden. International students can choose a homestay option where they are hosted by a family in the community, or they can choose to live in the single-gender student houses located next to campus. Student houses hold 8 students apiece along with the dorm parents who offer guidance and create a sense of family. Other international students participate in a homestay program and live with Carlisle families.  International students are supported by the Director of Residential Life, the International Program Coordinator and faculty mentors.

Recognition
Carlisle School has been named the "Best Private School" in Southwest Virginia in 2012, 2013, 2014, 2015 and 2016 by the readers of "Virginia Living" magazine.

Accreditation
Carlisle School is accredited by the Southern Association of Independent Schools, the Virginia Association of Independent Schools, the Southern Association of Colleges and Schools, and is recognized by the Virginia Board of Education as an accredited school through the Virginia Council for Private Education.

Notable alumni 
Matur Maker (born 1998), professional basketball player
Thon Maker (born 1997), professional basketball player for the Detroit Pistons.
Jeremy O. Harris (born 1989), playwright, best known for Daddy and Slave Play.
Edward Kizza (born 1998), professional soccer player for the New England Revolution

References

External links 
 

International Baccalaureate schools in Virginia
Private K-12 schools in Virginia
Educational institutions established in 1968
1968 establishments in Virginia
Schools in Martinsville, Virginia